"You're Not in Kansas Anymore" is a song written by Tim Nichols and Zack Turner, and recorded by American country music artist Jo Dee Messina. It was released in July 1996 as the second single from the album Jo Dee Messina. The song reached number 7 on the Billboard Hot Country Singles & Tracks chart.

Critical reception
Deborah Evans Price, of Billboard magazine reviewed the song favorably, calling the production, "right on the mark" and says that it provides a "strong framework for Messina's personality-packed vocals." She also says that the hook is one of the "most clever" to come out of Nashville in recent memory.

Chart performance
"You're Not in Kansas Anymore" debuted at number 66 on the U.S. Billboard Hot Country Singles & Tracks for the week of July 6, 1996.

Year-end charts

References

Songs about Kansas
1996 singles
Jo Dee Messina songs
Songs written by Tim Nichols
Song recordings produced by Byron Gallimore
Song recordings produced by Tim McGraw
Curb Records singles
Songs written by Zack Turner
1996 songs